Olaine Station is a railway station on the 22nd kilometer of the Riga – Jelgava Railway located in Olaine, Latvia. It was one of only four stations on the Riga - Jelgava route, when it was initially opened on November 21, 1868.

References 

Railway stations in Latvia
Olaine
Railway stations opened in 1868